The Centre de services scolaire des Portages-de-l'Outaouais (CSSPO) is one of 4 public school service centres operating in the Outaouais, Quebec. 

The CSSPO was created after the former Commission Scolaire des Portages-de-l'Outaouais was abolished in 2020.

It currently runs schools in the Hull and Aylmer sectors of the city of Gatineau as well as in the municipalities of Chelsea, Luskville and La Pêche. Its current president is Mario Crevier. The current general manager is Jean-Claude Bouchard.

The centre runs 21 primary schools and 4 high schools including école secondaire Grande-Rivière, école secondaire de l'Île and école secondaire Mont-Bleu. It also runs the école secondaire des Lacs in the municipality of La Pëche (Sainte-Cécile-de-Masham). Overall, schools in the CSSPO area have a total of about 14 000 students in all levels.

Its motto is : Ensemble vers la réussite! (Together towards success)

The centre had a foundation called "La Fondation CSPO" in which it accumulated proceeds from the general population in its jurisdictional territory in order to realize various projects across the territory, such as leisure or general activities, parent and student assistance, bursary or infrastructure upgrades.

Primary schools

Source:
 École de l'Amérique-Française
 École au Coeur-des-Collines (La Pêche/Sainte-Cécile-de-Masham)
 École Côte-du-Nord
 École de la Vallée-des-Voyageurs (Pontiac)
 École des Rapides-Deschênes
 École des Trois-Portages
 École du Dôme
 École primaire Grand Boisé (Chelsea)
 École du Mont Bleu
 École du Plateau
 École des Deux-Ruisseaux
 École du Vieux-Verger
 École du Village
 École Euclide-Lanthier 
 École Jean-de-Brébeuf
 École du Lac-des-Fées
 École Notre-Dame
 École du Parc-de-la-Montagne
 École Saint-Jean-Bosco
 École Saint-Paul
 École Saint-Rédempteur
 École du Marais

Secondary schools
École secondaire de l'île
École secondaire Mont-Bleu
École secondaire Grande-Rivière
École secondaire des Lacs
École de la Nouvelle-Ère

References

External links
 School Board Web Site

School districts in Quebec
Education in Gatineau